Francis Trevelyan Buckland (17 December 1826 – 19 December 1880), better known as Frank Buckland, was an English surgeon, zoologist,  natural historian, prolific writer, campaigner against river pollution, and researcher on fish-culture and fish farming.

The Buckland Foundation is a charity endowed from Buckland's estate. It funds a 'Buckland Professor' each year to give public talks throughout the United Kingdom and Ireland on matters of current concern in the commercial fisheries or aquaculture industry, as well as acting as custodian for the 'Buckland Collection'. 

Frank and his father William Buckland,  were determined to do all that they could to improve the diet of the poor. Frank was especially impressed by the potential of the lightly-exploited fisheries of the Victorian era to supply cheap and nutritious food. He was among the first naturalists to realise that making the most of the resources of the sea would require a comprehensive understanding of the biology of the main commercial species and of the world that they inhabited.

Frank was made 'Fish Culturist to the Queen' in 1865. He was appointed as one of two Inspectors of Salmon Fisheries in the Home Office in 1867. He took part in four Commissions of Inquiry into the sea fisheries of England, Wales and Scotland and in doing so also covered white fish, herring and shellfish. The 1878 Commission required Buckland to investigate whether  beam trawlers caused wasteful destruction of spawn and as a result were leading to a decline in the supply of fish. One of the recommendations was that "Inspectors should be required to collect statistical and other information and use this to report annually to Parliament on the condition of fisheries", thereby instigating the first systematic fisheries data collection in the United Kingdom.

Museum of Economic Fish Culture

Buckland founded a Museum of Economic Fish Culture in South Kensington in 1865. This aimed to inform the public about the fish of the British Isles and their fisheries, and he continued to work on this for the rest of his life. The remaining contents of Buckland's collection are now held by the Scottish Fisheries Museum in Anstruther. These include 45 plaster casts, some of which were hand-painted by the noted garden designer and artist Gertrude Jekyll, and an 1882 marble bust of Buckland by John Warrington Wood. The Scottish Fisheries Museum is also the registered office of the Buckland Foundation.

Two of Buckland's particular enthusiasms were public aquaria and fisheries exhibitions. In 1866 Buckland attended fisheries exhibitions in Arcachon and in Boulogne-Sur-Mer (France) and was awarded medals for his exhibits. Two further exhibitions were held in the Netherlands in 1867 and Buckland was awarded a Diploma of Honour for his contribution. He endeavoured to arouse interest in one being held in Britain but was not successful in this aim until 1881 (after his death), when a 'National Fisheries Exhibition' was held in the city of Norwich.

Buckland Professors and Lectures
Buckland Professors are appointed annually by a board of trustees. A complete list of Buckland Professors and their lecture subjects is provided below.

Source: Buckland Foundation

See also
 Francis Trevelyan Buckland
 Fisheries science
 Scottish Fisheries Museum

References

Fisheries science
Foundations based in the United Kingdom
Fisheries conservation organizations
Fishing in the United Kingdom
Defunct museums in England
Annual events in the United Kingdom
Lecture series